Michael Henry Metcalfe Jr. (born January 2, 1973) is a former utility player in Major League Baseball who played eight games for the Los Angeles Dodgers in 1998 and 2000.

He graduated from the University of Miami, and in 1993 he played collegiate summer baseball with the Hyannis Mets of the Cape Cod Baseball League where he was named a league all-star. He was selected by the Dodgers in the 3rd round of the 1994 MLB Draft. Metcalfe played eight games with the Dodgers in 1998 and 2000 – including four games as an outfielder and two as a second baseman – but spent most of his career in the minor league systems of the Dodgers and later the Cincinnati Reds and Kansas City Royals.

References

External links

1973 births
Living people
Colonial High School alumni
Major League Baseball outfielders
Los Angeles Dodgers players
Baseball players from Virginia
People from Quantico, Virginia
Miami Hurricanes baseball players
Hyannis Harbor Hawks players
Bakersfield Dodgers players
Vero Beach Dodgers players
San Antonio Missions players
San Bernardino Stampede players
Albuquerque Dukes players
Louisville RiverBats players
Chattanooga Lookouts players
Omaha Royals players